KKAY (1590 kHz AM) and KBRS (106.9 MHz FM) are two commercial radio stations in Louisiana.  KKAY 1590 is licensed to White Castle, Louisiana, and is owned by Liberty in Christ Jesus Ministry.  KBRS 106.9 is licensed to Belle Rose, Louisiana, and is owned by Alex Media, Inc.  Both stations simulcast their programming, directed at the region of Louisiana between Baton Rouge and New Orleans.

The stations' studios and offices are on Railroad Avenue in Donaldsonville, Louisiana.  KBRS's transmitter is off Ridge Road in White Castle.  KKAY's transmitter is in a different part of White Castle, off Route 405.

Programming
KKAY and KBRS broadcast a blend of urban gospel music and classic old time favorites, as well as airing Christian talk and teaching programs.  Religious leaders pay KKAY and KBRS for their time on the stations, and may seek donations on the air for their ministries.

KKAY and KBRS carry sports from several historically black colleges and universities. KKAY and KBRS also cover local high school sports and are the only radio stations in the Gulf South that carry girls high school softball.

History
KKAY first signed on the air in November 1976.  KBRS first signed on the air in January 2013.

References

External links

Radio stations in Louisiana